Afroneta basilewskyi is a species of sheet weaver found in Tanzania. It was described by Holm in 1968.

References

Endemic fauna of Tanzania
Linyphiidae
Invertebrates of Tanzania
Spiders of Africa
Spiders described in 1968